The 2013 Melbourne Storm season was the 16th in the club's history. They competed in the 2013 NRL season. They were coached by Craig Bellamy and captained by Cameron Smith. They had previously won the NRL's 2012 Telstra Premiership therefore started the season as reigning premiers.

Seven straight wins to start the season extended the club's winning streak to 15 games dating back to the previous campaign. The Origin period proved difficult to negotiate however with team unable to come up with some crucial wins at the business end of the season, eventually finishing in third place. Two finals losses to the Rabbitohs and Knights prematurely ended the season, as Storm did not make the Preliminary final stage for just the second time in eight years. The Storm attack was the shining light of the season, producing 98 tries to be ranked second in the competition. The team also had the best home record of any side in the NRL, losing just the one game at AAMI Park during the season. Cooper Cronk was rewarded for several seasons of brilliance, claiming his first Dally Medal Play of the Year honour. Off the field Storm experienced a change at the helm with Mark Evans replacing Ron Gauci as CEO midway through the season.

Season summary 
11 February – Craig Bellamy signed a contract that will see him remain as coach of the Storm until the end of 2016. The Storm also depart for England to compete in the World Club Challenge.
22 February – The Storm won the 2013 World Club Challenge 18–14 against Leeds Rhinos to be crowned World Champions for 2013.
Round 1 – The Storm began the season with a win over St George Illawarra in hot conditions.
Round 2 – The Storm's win over North Queensland also marked their 10th consecutive win, with the streak beginning in Round 22 of the 2012 season and extending through the finals.
Round 3 – Ryan Hoffman played his 200th NRL Game.
Round 4 – The Melbourne Storm played its 400th game. The Storm also won its 12th consecutive game, thus equalling its all-time record achieved in the 2011 NRL season.
Round 5 – The Storm won their 13th consecutive game, breaking their all-time club record.
Round 6 – The Storm defeated the South Sydney Rabbitohs to remain the only undefeated side in the NRL in 2013.
19 April – Gareth Widdop announces he will leave the Storm for the St George Illawarra Dragons at the end of the season.
19–21 April – The Storm provide 9 players to the three representative games over this weekend.
Round 7 – The Storms winning streak continued to 15 games with a win over the New Zealand Warriors on ANZAC Day.
1 May – The Storm re-sign Will Chambers to a contract that will see him remain with the club until 2017.
Round 8 – Melbourne suffers its first loss of the season ending its club record winning streak at 15 games. The Storm are one of only seven teams in the history of the NSWRL/ARL/NRL to have achieved this.
 21 May – A syndicate led by Bart Campbell take over the club as News Corp Australia divest their ownership of the companies holding the NRL franchise.
Round 10 – Melbourne Storm and Manly Sea Eagles Draw 10 all, the first draw of the NRL season.
Round 11 – Jordan Mclean made his debut as the 150th player for the Storm. Cameron Smith scored his 1400th point for the club.
Round 13 – Cameron Smith played his 250th NRL game and Justin O'Neill played his 50th.
Round 15 – Playing without Smith, Slater, Cronk and Hoffman the Storm lose 18–12 to Gold Coast. Ben Hampton scored 2 tries on debut and Gareth Widdop suffered a dislocated hip, ending his season.
Rounds 15–20 – The Storm encounter a poor run of form not helped by the State of Origin period where they gave up 4 first choice players to lose 4 out of five games.
Round 21 – The Storm returned to form with a massive 64-point win over the Canberra Raiders. The win equalled their all-time greatest winning margin record set in 2001 against Wests Tigers. During the Game, Billy Slater also scored his 150th try.
Round 22 – Brett Finch plays his 50th Game for the Melbourne Storm in a 26–8 win over South Sydney.
Round 23 – Bryan Norrie plays his 150th NRL Game.
Round 24 – The Storm defeat the Parramatta Eels 64 – 4 in their biggest ever win over the Eels. Kevin Proctor also plays his 100th game.
Round 26 – The Storm win their final game of the regular season in Golden point extra time against Gold Coast Titans. Cameron Smith also kicks his 1500th point in the match.
 Finals Series – The Storms season ended with two consecutive losses in the Finals series to South Sydney and then Newcastle.

Milestone games

Jersey 
In 2013 the Storm jerseys were again made by Kooga. They created a New Jersey for 2013 which featured more navy blue and a more prominent and deeper V that integrated the sponsor's (Crown Casino) logo into the design better, the lightning bolts are also now purple for the first time. Colours yellow and white were removed and reduced respectively so that the jersey is essentially half navy blue and half purple. The away jersey is a white version of the home jersey.

Special Jerseys 
 For Round 10, the Storm released a special jersey for the "Women of League" round, it was worn on 20 May against Manly Sea Eagles. The jersey consisted of navy blue and pink horizontal hoops.
 For Round 13 the Storm wore a jersey to promote the Superman movie Man of Steel. The jerseys design is similar to that of the costume worn in the movie with the red S logo on the front.
 For Round 14 the Storm wore their 2013 heritage jersey, which was a replica of their original 1998 jersey.
 For the Round 17 game against the Brisbane Broncos they wore their "Big Battle" jersey.

Statistics 
Statistics Source: Table current as at the end of 2013 season.

Most Points in a Game: 20
 Cameron Smith – 10 Goals vs Canberra Raiders (4 August)
 Cameron Smith – 10 Goals vs Parramatta Eels (25 August)

Most tries in a Game: 3
 Billy Slater vs Brisbane (29 March)
 Mahe Fonua vs Canberra (4 August)
 Sisa Waqa vs Canberra (4 August)
 Billy Slater vs Parramatta (25 August)

Highest score in a game: 68 points
 vs Canberra Raiders (4 August)

Greatest winning margin: 64 points
 vs Canberra Raiders (4 August)

Fixtures

Pre Season

Regular season

Finals 

Source NRL.com:

Ladder

2013 Coaches 
 Craig Bellamy -Head Coach
 Kevin Walters – Assistant Coach
 David Kidwell -Assistant Coach
 Anthony Seibold -U/20 Coach
 Alex Corvo -Strength and Conditioning
 Tony Ayoub -Head Physiotherapist

2013 Squad 
As of 16 July 2013.

2013 player movement 
2013 Squad Signings

2013 Squad Departures

Representative honours 
The following players have played a representative match in 2013. (C) = Captain

Awards

Trophy Cabinet
2013 World Club Challenge Trophy

Melbourne Storm Awards Night
Held at Peninsula Docklands on Friday 11 October 2013.

 Melbourne Storm Player of the Year: Cameron Smith
 Melbourne Storm Rookie of the Year: Tohu Harris
 Sukuki Members' Player of Year: Cameron Smith
 Melbourne Storm Most Improved: Kenny Bromwich
 Melbourne Storm Best Back: Cooper Cronk
 Melbourne Storm Best Forward: Jesse Bromwich
 Feeder Club Player of the Year: 
 Darren Bell U20s Player of Year: Pride Petterson-Robati
 Greg Brentnall Young Achiever’s Award: Brandon Manase
 U20s Best Back:
 U20s Best Forward:
 Mick Moore Club Person of the Year: 
 Life Member Inductee: Ryan Hoffman
 Best try: Will Chambers

Dally M Awards Night
The NRL Dally M Awards were held on 1 October 2013. 
Dally M Medal: Cooper Cronk
Dally M Captain of the Year: Cameron Smith
Dally M Representative Player of the Year: Cameron Smith
Dally M Hooker of the Year: Cameron Smith
Dally M Halfback of the Year: Cooper Cronk

RLPA Awards Night
RLPA Australia Representative Player of the Year: Cameron Smith
NRL Academic Player of the Year: Bryan Norrie

Additional Awards
 World Club Challenge Medal: Cooper Cronk
 QRL Ron McAuliffe Medal: Cameron Smith
Petero Civoniceva Medal; Cody Walker

Notes

References

Melbourne Storm seasons
Melbourne Storm season